Hecatera weissi is a species of moth of the family Noctuidae. It is found in southern Europe, North Africa, Turkey, Israel, Jordan and Saudi Arabia.

Adults are on wing from January to April in semi-arid regions and from March to May in temperate regions. There is one generation per year.

Subspecies
Hecatera weissi weissi
Hecatera weissi levantina

External links
 Hadeninae of Israel
Lepiforum.de

Hecatera
Moths of Europe
Moths of the Middle East
Moths described in 1952